Iron Maiden (Melina Vostokova (birth name); Melina Von Vostokoff; Мелина Востокова) is a supervillain appearing in American comic books published by Marvel Comics. Created by Ralph Macchio and George Pérez, she first appears in Marvel Fanfare #11 (November 1983). The character is Russian and is depicted most notably as an enemy of Black Widow.

The character made her live-action debut in the Marvel Cinematic Universe film Black Widow, portrayed by Rachel Weisz.

Publication history

Iron Maiden first appeared in Marvel Fanfare #11 (November 1983), created by Ralph Macchio and George Pérez.

Fictional character biography
Melina Vostokova was an agent recruited by the Government of the Russian Federation. Feeling she was living in the shadow of Natalia Romanova / Black Widow, Iron Maiden started to develop a deep hatred for her. Eventually, she stopped working for the Government of Russia and became a freelance agent and assassin.

Iron Maiden was among the assassins hired to kill Black Widow. While she fought Natalia Romanova, Iron Maiden was interrupted by Jimmy Woo and S.H.I.E.L.D. agents who arrived and put an end to the battle. Eventually, Iron Maiden managed to escape from Black Widow and Jimmy Woo.

She then joined the Femizons, a team of superhuman female criminals led by Superia, whose purpose was to gain power and sterilize the planet in order to create a new world where women would rule. Iron Maiden served as one of Superia's lieutenants.

Iron Maiden was eventually apprehended and coerced into joining the Thunderbolts during the Civil War series.

Iron Maiden later joined the Soviet Revolutionaries Remont Six to led in an attack on an A.I.M. base outside the Forbidden Zone in Russia. Her team overpowered Red Guardian and Crimson Dynamo with ease but Ursa Major was able to knock most of the group out.

Powers and abilities
Iron Maiden is a master martial artist, assassin, and spy, with knowledge in horticulture. She is also a weapon expert. She wears a lightweight but strong metal suit that protects her from impacts, bullets and energy weapons. It appears to function as a form of exoskeleton, enhancing her strength and durability to an unknown degree.

Reception

Accolades 

 In 2021, Screen Rant ranked Iron Maiden 2nd in their "Black Widow's 10 Biggest Enemies" list and 5th in their "Red Room's Most Powerful Members" list.
 In 2022, Screen Rant included Iron Maiden in their "10 Comic Book Thunderbolts That Should Join The MCU Team" list.

Other versions

Earth X
In the Earth X trilogy, a version of Iron Maiden plays a major role as a different character from the original Earth-616 version. Iron Maiden is a scientist who works on a project initiated by Reed Richards, which is meant to power the world using vibranium, in order to create an efficient energy source which would have no limit. During her exposition to vibranium, she becomes a human mutate and gains the ability to have full control over vibranium. Using her powers, Iron Maiden was able to create a vibranium amor all over her body, generate firing weapons, demonstrated energy projection, and had the power of flight, although the extent and limits of her powers remain unknown. She was forced to become a servant of the Red Skull until his death.

Mangaverse
In the Marvel Mangaverse reality, a version of Iron Maiden features under the name of Antoinette "Toni" Stark. The character is depicted as the twin sister of Tony Stark, a former agent of SHIELD who took over Stark Industries, after Tony Stark mysteriously disappeared. Later, the character dies during a battle with the Hulk.

Exiles
In the New Exiles series, an unidentified female uses the Iron Maiden alias while using her own battlesuit and is a member of "Bloodforce" alongside Blackdog, Bloodwitch, Rough Justice, and Sandstorm.

Ultimate Marvel
The Ultimate Marvel equivalent of Iron Maiden was an alternative codename for Natalia Romanova / Black Widow while sporting her own black suit of armor also dubbed Cybernatrix.

In other media
 The "Iron Maiden" appears in the Avengers Assemble episode "World War Hulk" as a battlesuit utilized by Natasha Romanova / Black Widow.
 Melina Vostokoff / Black Widow appears in Black Widow, portrayed by Rachel Weisz. This version is a seasoned spy and lead scientist for the Red Room who developed a means of controlling their Widows and serves as a mother figure to Natasha Romanoff and Yelena Belova, and a significant other to Alexei Shostakov. After reuniting with the trio,  Vostokoff joins them in dismantling the Red Room.

References

External links
 

Characters created by George Pérez
Characters created by Ralph Macchio
Comics characters introduced in 1983
Fictional assassins in comics
Fictional Russian people
Fictional secret agents and spies in comics
Marvel Comics female supervillains